Jai Kishan is an Indian politician belonging to Indian National Congress. He is an ex M.L.A from Sultan Pur Majra in Delhi, Sandeep Kumar of Aam Aadmi Party defeated him in 2015 election.

Political career

Jai Kishan was elected for the First Legislative Assembly of Delhi in 1993. His wife was elected for the second legislative assembly election of Delhi in 1998. In 2003, he contested again the Third Assembly Elections of Delhi and won by a margin of 18,921 votes, defeating Satish Kumar (BJP). He has been elected again in Fourth and Fifth Assembly Elections of Delhi in 2008 and 2013 respectively.

References

Living people
Members of the Delhi Legislative Assembly
Indian National Congress politicians
Delhi MLAs 2013–2015
Delhi MLAs 2008–2013
Year of birth missing (living people)